The Neighborhood is an American sitcom television series created by Jim Reynolds that premiered on CBS on October 1, 2018. The series follows a white Midwestern family as they adjust to moving into a predominantly black neighborhood in Pasadena, California. It stars Cedric the Entertainer, Max Greenfield, Sheaun McKinney, Marcel Spears, Hank Greenspan, Tichina Arnold, and Beth Behrs. Five seasons of the show have aired so far. In January 2023, the series was renewed for a sixth season.

Premise
The Neighborhood follows Dave Johnson, the "nicest guy in the Midwest", who moves his white family into a tough, predominantly African American neighborhood in L.A., where not everyone appreciates his extreme neighborliness. That includes their new next-door neighbor Calvin Butler.

Cast and characters

Main
 Cedric the Entertainer as Calvin Butler, Tina's husband and Malcolm and Marty's father. He owns an auto repair shop called Calvin's Pit Stop, until selling it in Season 5.
 Max Greenfield as Dave Johnson, Gemma's husband and Grover's father. He is a professional conflict mediator, a military veteran, and a graduate of Western Michigan University in Kalamazoo, Michigan.
 Tichina Arnold as Tina Butler, Calvin's wife and Malcolm and Marty's mother. She was once an aspiring singer, then worked the front desk at Calvin's auto shop before starting her own cupcake business. In season 5, Tina accepts a part-time job as music teacher at Gemma's school.
 Beth Behrs as Gemma Johnson, Dave's wife and Grover's mother. Her new job as principal at a private school in Los Angeles is the reason for the Johnson family moving to California.
 Sheaun McKinney as Malcolm Butler, Calvin and Tina's older son. He was once a professional baseball player working his way through the minor leagues until an injury ended his career. He had trouble finding steady employment until Marty got him a job as a security guard at JPL in season 2. In season 4, he is hired as the hitting coach for the USC baseball team.
 Marcel Spears as Marty Butler, Calvin and Tina's younger son. He is a successful engineer at JPL with several nerdy hobbies and interests. Chronically unlucky in love, Marty meets a boxer named Necie in season 4 and gets engaged to her, only to have the engagement end in season 5, shortly before their wedding date.
 Hank Greenspan as Grover Johnson, Dave and Gemma's son who is initially an elementary school student. He begins middle school in season 5.

Recurring
 Malik S. as Trey, Malcolm's friend; it was later revealed that his real name is Leslie
 Earthquake as Que, the owner of the barbershop that Calvin and Dave frequent.
 Gary Anthony Williams as Ernie, an old friend of Calvin's who runs a neighborhood bar.
 Sloan Robinson as Old Miss Kim, a grumpy neighbor who enjoys the company of younger men.
 Chelsea Harris as Necie, a female boxer and Marty's girlfriend, later ex-fiancé.
 Sean Larkins as Randall, the mailman

Notable guests
 Maurice LaMarche as HandyRandy79 ("Welcome to the Repipe")
 Juliette Goglia as Meadow ("Welcome to Game Night")
 Marilu Henner as Paula ("Welcome to Thanksgiving")
 Alexandra Chando as Chloe ("Welcome to the Dinner Guest")
 Jeris Lee Poindexter as Tommy ("Welcome to the Stolen Sneakers")
 Mandell Maughan as Lyndsey ("Welcome to the Fundraiser")
 Jim Meskimen as Dr. Bancroft ("Welcome to the Fundraiser")
 Marla Gibbs as Miss Simpson ("Welcome to the Yard Sale")
 Josh Brener as Trevor ("Welcome to Malcolm's Job")
 Geoff Stults as Logan ("Welcome to Logan #2")
 Jim O'Heir as Maynard ("Welcome to the Camping Trip")
 Brian Thomas Smith as Ed ("Welcome to the Bully")
 Kym Whitley as LaTonya ("Welcome to Bowling"; "Welcome to the Invasion")
 Cocoa Brown as Regina ("Welcome to Bowling"; "Welcome to the Invasion")
 Edy Ganem as Sofia ("Welcome to the Dealbreaker"; "Welcome to the Trivia Night"; "Welcome to the Commercial")
 Deborah Baker Jr. as Brittany ("Welcome to the Freeloader"; "Welcome to the Turnaround")
 Victor Williams as Pastor Don ("Welcome to the New Pastor")
 Ashleigh Hairston as Kiera ("Welcome to the New Pastor"; "Welcome to the Bad Review")
 Riki Lindhome as Kristen ("Welcome to the Jump")
 Richard Gant as Walter ("Welcome to the Speed Bump"; "Welcome to the Property"; "Welcome to the Art Class")
 Wayne Brady as Councilman Isaiah Evans ("Welcome to the Campaign"; "Welcome to the Election")
 Suzy Nakamura as Dr. Chen ("Welcome to Couples Therapy")
 Milan Carter as Wyatt ("Welcome to the Rooster")
 Brian Posehn as Clem ("Welcome to the Road Trip")
 Patricia Belcher as Sister Sabrina ("Welcome to the Turnaround")
 Bob Clendenin as Stan ("Welcome to the Shakedown")
 Michael Gladis as Dr. Fisher ("Welcome to the Procedure")
 Samm Levine as Jerry ("Welcome to the Dad Band")
 George Lopez as Victor Alvarez ("Welcome to the Challenge")
 Mike Estime as "Crackhead Victor" ("Welcome to the Intervention", "Welcome to the Dream Girls")
 Nicole Sullivan as Alexis ("Welcome to the Sister from Another Mister")
 Danny Woodburn as Mayor Clyborne ("Welcome to the Sister from Another Mister")
 Anjali Bhimani as Suraya ("Welcome to Your Match")
 Jerome Bettis as himself ("Welcome to the Ex-Files")
 Tracy Morgan as Curtis Butler, Calvin's younger brother ("Welcome to Bro Money, Bro Problems")
 Patti LaBelle as Marilyn, Calvin's mother ("Welcome to the Mama Drama")
 Shanola Hampton as Nicki ("Welcome to the Dream Girls")
 Gina Yashere as Chika ("Welcome to the Ring")
 John Ross Bowie as Gregory ("Welcome to the Art of Negotiation")
 Troy Winbush as Kenny ("Welcome to the Hot Prospect")
 Issac Ryan Brown as Peter ("Welcome to the Hot Prospect")

Episodes

Production

Development
On September 27, 2017, it was announced that CBS had given the production, then titled Here Comes the Neighborhood, a pilot production commitment. The pilot was written by Jim Reynolds who was also set to executive produce alongside Aaron Kaplan, Dana Honor, and Wendi Trilling. Production companies involved with the pilot include Kapital Entertainment, CBS Television Studios, and Trill Television. On January 27, 2018, the production officially received a pilot order. On February 9, 2018, it was announced that James Burrows would direct the pilot.

On May 9, 2018, it was announced that CBS had given the production, now titled Welcome to the Neighborhood, a series order. A few days later, it was announced that the title of the show had been changed to The Neighborhood. A day after that, it was announced that the series would premiere in the fall of 2018 and air on Mondays at 8:00 P.M. On July 9, 2018, it was announced that the series would premiere on October 1, 2018.  On October 19, 2018, it was announced that CBS had ordered an additional eight episodes of the series, bringing the first season total up to twenty-one episodes. On January 25, 2019, CBS renewed the series for a second season and premiered on September 23, 2019. On May 6, 2020, CBS renewed the series for a third season, which premiered on November 16, 2020. On February 17, 2021, CBS renewed the series for a fourth season. On April 5, 2021, Reynolds stepped down as the showrunner and executive producer after three seasons due to complaints of his "insensitive comments and other race-related issues over a period of time". On June 7, 2021, Meg DeLoatch joined the series as an executive producer and showrunner for the fourth season to replace Reynolds. The fourth season premiered on September 20, 2021. On January 24, 2022, CBS renewed the series for a fifth season. On March 26, 2022, DeLoatch exited as the showrunner. On June 8, 2022, Bill Martin and Mike Schiff were announced as the new showrunners of the series. The fifth season premiered on September 19, 2022. On January 23, 2023, CBS renewed the series for a sixth season.

The show is filmed on a closed set without a studio audience due to COVID-19; a laugh track is added during post-production.

Casting
In March 2018, it was announced that Sheaun McKinney, Marcel Spears, Cedric the Entertainer, Josh Lawson, Tichina Arnold had joined the pilot's main cast. On April 4, 2018, it was reported that Dreama Walker had joined the cast in a main role. On May 15, 2018, it was announced that Max Greenfield had replaced Lawson in the role of Dave Johnson. On June 11, 2018, it was announced that Beth Behrs had replaced Walker in the role of Gemma Johnson. On October 11, 2018, it was reported that Marilu Henner had been cast in a guest starring role. On December 10, 2018, it was announced that Marla Gibbs would make a guest appearance in the series.

Release

Marketing
On May 16, 2018, CBS released the first official trailer for the series. On July 11, 2018, a short promo video for the series was released, showcasing the addition of Greenfield and Behrs, with newly filmed footage from the re-shot pilot episode. Two days later, a new full length trailer featuring Greenfield and Behrs was released.

Premiere
On September 12, 2018, the series took part in the 12th Annual PaleyFest Fall Television Previews which featured a preview screening of the series and a conversation with cast members including Cedric the Entertainer, Tichina Arnold, Max Greenfield, and Beth Behrs.

Reception

Critical response
The series has been met with a mixed to negative response from critics upon its premiere, often citing bad character writing and mishandling of the current social environment as the main factors. On the review aggregation website Rotten Tomatoes, the series holds an approval rating of 24% with an average rating of 4.31 out of 10, based on 17 reviews. The website's critical consensus reads, "While the show's likable cast has potential, poor attempts at cultural commentary and weak characterizations leave The Neighborhood stuck in a creative dead end." Metacritic, which uses a weighted average, assigned the series a score of 50 out of 100 based on 8 critics, indicating "mixed or average reviews".

Ratings

Home media
CBS Home Entertainment released the complete first season on DVD on August 4, 2020. The second season was released on December 1, 2020. The third season was released on July 27, 2021.

Other appearances
Calvin and Tina appeared in the Bob Hearts Abishola episode "Compress to Impress" which aired March 14, 2022.

References

External links

2010s American sitcoms
2020s American sitcoms
2018 American television series debuts
CBS original programming
English-language television shows
Television series about families
Television series by CBS Studios
Television shows set in Pasadena, California
Television productions suspended due to the COVID-19 pandemic
Television series by Kapital Entertainment